Schlegeliaceae is a family of plants native to tropical America. This family is sometimes included in Scrophulariaceae.

References

 
Lamiales families